EAD may refer to:

 EAD socket, an obsolete network connection socket
 , a Latin term meaning "the same", abbreviated 
 Early afterdepolarization, a type of cardiac dysrhythmia
 Earlsfield railway station in London, station code EAD
 Elite athletes with a disability, a term to describe athletes taking part in disabled sports
 Emergency airworthiness directive, issued when an unsafe condition exists that requires immediate action by an aircraft owner or operator
 Employment authorization document, in the United States
 Encoded Archival Description, an archival data standard
 Engin Altan Düzyatan, a Turkish actor
 Environment Agency Abu Dhabi, a government agency
 Equivalent air depth, a way of approximating decompression requirements
 European AIS Database, an aviation database
 Exposure at default, a measure of risk used in banking regulation
 Nintendo Entertainment Analysis & Development, a defunct division of Nintendo